Henry Cottingham  was an Anglican priest in Ireland during the 17th century.

Cottingham was educated at Trinity College, Dublin. He was the incumbent at Ardbraccan for many years; and Dean of Clonmacnoise from 1668 until 1681. In 1781 Cottingham became Archdeacon of Meath, holding the post until his death on 20 February 1698.

References

Alumni of Trinity College Dublin
Deans of Clonmacnoise
Archdeacons of Meath
17th-century Irish Anglican priests
1698 deaths
Year of birth missing